This article shows the roster of all participating teams at the 2021 FIVB Volleyball Men's Nations League.

The following is the Argentine roster in the 2021 Men's Nations League.

Head coach:  Marcelo Méndez

 
2 Federico Pereyra 
3 Jan Martínez Franchi 
5 Nicolás Uriarte 
6 Cristian Poglajen 
7 Facundo Conte 
8 Agustín Loser 
9 Santiago Danani 
10 Nicolás Lazo 
11 Sebastián Solé 
12 Bruno Lima 
13 Ezequiel Palacios 
14 Pablo Crer 
15 Luciano De Cecco 
16 Luciano Palonsky 
17 Nicolás Méndez 
18 Martín Ramos 
19 Franco Massimino

The following is the Australia roster in the 2021 Men's Nations League.

Head coach:  Marcos Miranda

1 Beau Graham 
2 Arshdeep Dosanjh 
3 Steven Macdonald 
7 James Weir 
8 Trent O'Dea 
11 Luke Perry 
12 Nehemiah Mote 
15 Luke Smith 
16 Thomas Douglas-Powell 
21 Nicholas Butler 
27 Max Senica 
28 Tim Taylor 
29 Ethan Garrett 
31 Matthew Aubrey 
32 Elliot Azeez Oluwatobi 
33 Sam Flowerday 
34 Billy Greber

The following is the Brazil roster in the 2021 Men's Nations League.

Head coach:  Carlos Schwanke

1 Bruno Rezende 
3 João Rafael Ferreira 
5 Maurício Borges Silva 
6 Fernando Kreling 
8 Wallace de Souza 
9 Yoandy Leal 
11 Gabriel Kavalkievicz 
12 Isac Santos 
13 Maurício Souza 
14 Douglas Souza 
15 Maique Nascimento 
16 Lucas Saatkamp 
17 Thales Hoss 
18 Ricardo Lucarelli 
21 Alan Souza 
23 Flávio Gualberto

The following is the Bulgaria roster in the 2021 Men's Nations League.

Head coach:  Silvano Prandi

1 Denis Karyagin 
2 Stefan Chavdarov 
3 Nikolay Kolev 
4 Martin Atanasov 
6 Vladimir Stankov 
9 Georgi Seganov 
10 Svetoslav Stankov 
11 Aleks Grozdanov 
12 Georgi Petrov 
14 Asparuh Asparuhov 
15 Gordan Lyutskanov 
16 Vladislav Ivanov 
19 Tsvetan Sokolov 
22 Nikolay Kartev 
24 Martin Ivanov 
25 Radoslav Parapunov 
26 Svetoslav Ivanov

The following is the Canada roster in the 2021 Men's Nations League.

Head coach:  Glenn Hoag

1 Tyler Sanders 
2 John Gordon Perrin 
3 Steven Marshall 
4 Nicholas Hoag 
6 Jordan Pereira 
7 Stephen Maar 
8 Jay Blankenau 
10 Ryan Sclater 
11 Daniel Jansen Van Doorn 
12 Lucas Van Berkel 
13 Sharone Vernon-Evans 
14 Eric Loeppky 
17 Graham Vigrass 
19 Blair Bann 
20 Arthur Szwarc 
21 Brett Walsh 
23 Danny Demyanenko

The following is the France roster in the 2021 Men's Nations League.

Head coach:  Laurent Tillie

1 Barthélémy Chinenyeze 
2 Jenia Grebennikov 
4 Jean Patry 
6 Benjamin Toniutti 
7 Kévin Tillie 
8 Julien Lyneel 
9 Earvin N'Gapeth 
11 Antoine Brizard 
12 Stéphen Boyer 
14 Nicolas Le Goff 
16 Daryl Bultor 
17 Trévor Clévenot 
18 Thibault Rossard 
19 Yacine Louati 
20 Benjamin Diez 
21 Théo Faure 
23 Léo Meyer 
24 Moussé Gueye

The following is the Germany roster in the 2021 Men's Nations League.

Head coach:  Andrea Giani

1 Christian Fromm 
3 Ruben Schott 
5 Moritz Reichert 
6 Denis Kaliberda 
7 David Sossenheimer 
8 Marcus Böhme 
10 Julian Zenger 
13 Simon Hirsch 
15 Noah Baxpöhler 
16 Eric Burggräf 
17 Jan Zimmermann 
18 Florian Krage 
19 Erik Röhrs 
20 Linus Weber 
21 Tobias Krick 
25 Lukas Maase

The following is the Iran roster in the 2021 Men's Nations League.

Head coach:  Vladimir Alekno

2 Milad Ebadipour 
3 Reza Abedini 
4 Saeid Marouf 
6 Mohammad Mousavi 
7 Purya Fayazi 
8 Mohammadreza Hazratpour 
9 Masoud Gholami 
10 Amir Ghafour 
11 Saber Kazemi 
12 Morteza Sharifi 
15 Ali Asghar Mojarrad 
17 Meisam Salehi 
18 Mohammad Taher Vadi 
21 Arman Salehi 
22 Amir Hossein Esfandiar 
23 Bardia Saadat 
24 Javad Karimi

The following is the Italy roster in the 2021 Men's Nations League.

Head coach:  Antonio Valentini

1 Davide Gardini 
7 Fabio Balaso 
15 Riccardo Sbertoli 
18 Alessandro Michieletto 
20 Gabriele Nelli 
21 Luca Spirito 
23 Giulio Pinali 
24 Oreste Cavuto 
25 Marco Vitelli 
26 Lorenzo Cortesia 
27 Leonardo Scanferla 
28 Francesco Recine 
29 Mattia Bottolo 
30 Leandro Mosca 
31 Filippo Federici

The following is the Japan roster in the 2021 Men's Nations League.

Head coach:  Yuichi Nakagaichi

1 Kunihiro Shimizu 
2 Taishi Onodera 
3 Naonobu Fujii 
4 Issei Otake 
5 Tatsuya Fukuzawa 
6 Akihiro Yamauchi 
11 Yuji Nishida 
12 Masahiro Sekita 
13 Masaki Oya 
14 Yūki Ishikawa 
15 Haku Ri 
16 Kentaro Takahashi 
17 Kenta Takanashi 
19 Tatsunori Otsuka 
20 Tomohiro Yamamoto 
21 Ran Takahashi 
24 Tomohiro Ogawa

The following is the Netherlands roster in the 2021 Men's Nations League.

Head coach:  Roberto Piazza

2 Wessel Keemink 
4 Thijs ter Horst 
5 Luuc van der Ent 
6 Just Dronkers 
7 Gijs Jorna 
8 Fabian Plak 
10 Maikel van Zeist 
12 Bennie Tuinstra 
13 Steven Ottevanger 
14 Nimir Abdel-Aziz 
15 Gijs van Solkema 
17 Michael Parkinson 
18 Robbert Andringa 
19 Freek de Weijer 
21 Stijn van Schie 
22 Twan Wiltenburg 
25 Stijn van Tilburg

The following is the Poland roster in the 2021 Men's Nations League.

Head coach:  Vital Heynen

1 Piotr Nowakowski 
2 Maciej Muzaj 
4 Marcin Komenda 
5 Łukasz Kaczmarek 
6 Bartosz Kurek 
9 Wilfredo León 
10 Damian Wojtaszek 
11 Fabian Drzyzga 
12 Grzegorz Łomacz 
13 Michał Kubiak 
14 Aleksander Śliwka 
15 Jakub Kochanowski 
16 Kamil Semeniuk 
17 Paweł Zatorski 
20 Mateusz Bieniek 
21 Tomasz Fornal 
22 Bartosz Bednorz 
77 Karol Kłos 
99 Norbert Huber

The following is the Russia roster in the 2021 Men's Nations League.

Head coach:  Tuomas Sammelvuo

1 Yaroslav Podlesnykh 
2 Ilia Vlasov 
4 Artem Volvich 
6 Evgeny Baranov 
7 Dmitry Volkov 
9 Ivan Iakovlev 
10 Denis Bogdan 
11 Pavel Pankov 
13 Dmitry Muserskiy 
15 Viktor Poletaev 
17 Maksim Mikhaylov 
18 Egor Kliuka 
20 Ilyas Kurkaev 
24 Igor Kobzar 
27 Valentin Golubev

The following is the Serbia roster in the 2021 Men's Nations League.

Head coach:  Slobodan Kovač

2 Uroš Kovačević 
3 Milorad Kapur 
6 Nikola Peković 
7 Petar Krsmanović 
8 Marko Ivović 
9 Nikola Jovović 
10 Miran Kujundžić 
11 Aleksa Batak 
12 Pavle Perić 
13 Stevan Simić 
14 Aleksandar Atanasijević 
16 Dražen Luburić 
18 Marko Podraščanin 
21 Vuk Todorović 
23 Božidar Vučićević 
26 Davide Kovač

The following is the Slovenia roster in the 2021 Men's Nations League.

Head coach:  Alberto Giuliani

1 Tonček Štern 
2 Alen Pajenk 
3 Gregor Pernuš 
4 Jan Kozamernik 
5 Alen Šket 
6 Mitja Gasparini 
9 Dejan Vinčić 
10 Sašo Štalekar 
11 Žiga Štern 
12 Jan Klobučar 
13 Jani Kovačič 
15 Matic Videčnik 
16 Gregor Ropret 
17 Tine Urnaut 
18 Klemen Čebulj 
19 Rok Možič

The following is the United States roster in the 2021 Men's Nations League.

Head coach:  John Speraw

1 Matt Anderson 
3 Taylor Sander 
4 Jeffrey Jendryk 
5 Kyle Ensing 
6 Mitchell Stahl 
7 Kawika Shoji 
8 Torey DeFalco 
9 Jake Hanes 
11 Micah Christenson 
12 Maxwell Holt 
13 Benjamin Patch 
15 Brenden Sander 
16 Joshua Tuaniga 
17 Thomas Jaeschke 
18 Garrett Muagututia 
19 Taylor Averill 
20 David Smith 
21 Dustin Watten 
22 Erik Shoji

References

External links
FIVB Volleyball Nations League 2021 – official website

FIVB Volleyball Men's Nations League
2021
2021 in men's volleyball